The following is a list of notable deaths in October 1995.

Entries for each day are listed alphabetically by surname. A typical entry lists information in the following sequence:
 Name, age, country of citizenship at birth, subsequent country of citizenship (if applicable), reason for notability, cause of death (if known), and reference.

October 1995

1
Aditya Vikram Birla, 51, Indian industrialist, prostate cancer.
Einer Boberg, 59-60, Danish-Canadian speech pathologist.
René Cloke, 90, British illustrator and watercolorist.
Margaret Gorman, 90, American beauty queen and 1st Miss America.
Felipe Rivera, 24, Chilean tennis player, traffic collision.
Henry P. Smith III, 84, American politician.

2
John Ayers, 42, American National Football League offensive lineman, liver cancer.
Otto Chr. Bastiansen, 77, Norwegian chemist.
Hajir Darioush, 57, Iranian film maker.
Helmut Degen, 84, German composer.
Elizabeth Jane Lloyd, 67, British artist and teacher.
Ben Meier, 77, American politician.

3
Col Austen, 74, Australian rules footballer.
Orlando Aloysius Battista, 78, Canadian chemist and writer.
John Chickerneo, 78, American football player.
Kevin Commins, 67, South African cricketer.
Plinio Corrêa de Oliveira, 86, Brazilian intellectual and activist.
Štefan Jačiansky, 65, Slovak football manager.
Nippy Jones, 70, American baseball player.
Elena Quiroga, 73, Spanish writer.
Francis O. Schmitt, 91, American biologist and professor.
M. P. Sivagnanam, 89, Indian freedom fighter and politician.
Leon Surmelian, 89, Armenian-American author.
Charles L. Veach, 51, American astronaut, cancer.

4
Fabio Albarelli, 52, Italian competitive sailor and Olympic medalist.
Matt Armstrong, 83, Scottish footballer.
Woody Bledsoe, 73, American mathematician, computer scientist, and educator, amyotrophic lateral sclerosis.
Else Brems, 87, Danish contralto.
Arturo García Buhr, 89, Argentine actor and film director, suicide.
Dean Roden Chapman, 73, American mechanical engineer with NASA.
Fred Fehl, 89, American photographer.
Masood Rana, 57, Pakistani film playback singer.
Eu Chooi Yip, 76, Malaysian politician and Singaporean activist.

5
Walter Edwin Arnoldi, 77, American aeronautical engineer.
Karl Johan Baadsvik, 85, Canadian skier.
Arthur Barbosa, 87, English artist.
Lillian Fuchs, 93, American viola player, composer and teacher.
Linda Gary, 50, American voice actress (He-Man and the Masters of the Universe, She-Ra and the Princesses of Power, Spider-Man).
Dick Jurgens, 85, American bandleader.
Pin Malakul, 91, Thai educator and politician.
Abdurehim Ötkür, 72, Uyghur author and poet.

6
Michael Allen, 62, English cricketer.
Paul Baize, 94, a French pediatrician and amateur astronomer.
Karl Band, 94, German architect.
Eileen Cassidy, 63, Irish Fianna Fáil politician.
Benoît Chamoux, 34, French Alpinist, disappeared during climb.
Hughie Charles, 88, English songwriter and impresario.
José Antonio de Armas Chitty, 86, Venezuelan historian, poet, biographer and researcher.
Iván Mándy, 76, Hungarian writer.
Anthony Newlands, 70, British actor.

7
Ya'akov Arnon, 82, Israeli economist and government official.
Mikhail Butkevich, 69, Soviet/Russian theatre director and drama professor at the Russian Academy of Theatre Arts.
Roberto Cabrera, 81, Chilean footballer.
Ralph Churchfield, 77, American basketball player.
Gérard de Vaucouleurs, 77, French astronomer.
Emanuele Del Vecchio, 61, Brazilian football forward.
Gabriele Kröcher-Tiedemann, 44, German far-left militant, cancer.
Louis Meyer, 91, American Hall of Fame race car driver.
Olga Taussky-Todd, 89, Austrian and later Czech-American mathematician.
Harley A. Wilhelm, 95, American chemist.

8
Erich Brost, 91, German journalist and publisher.
John Cairncross, 82, Scottish civil servant and Soviet spy during World War II.
Alvaro Cartei, 84, Italian painter and ceramist.
Christopher Keene, 48, American conductor and director of the New York City Opera, AIDS.
Kentarō Ogawa, 61, Japanese baseball player.
Olavi Salsola, 61, Finnish middle distance runner and Olympian.
Patric Walker, 64, American-British astrologer.
Geoffrey Warnock, 72, English philosopher and Vice-Chancellor of Oxford University.

9
Kamal Bose, 80, Indian cinematographer.
Henry W. Clune, 105, American writer and journalist.
Alec Douglas-Home, 92, Prime Minister of the United Kingdom.
Zaim Imamović, 34, Bosnian commander, killed in action.
Kukrit Pramoj, 84, Thai politician and 13th Prime Minister of Thailand, diabetes.
John A. Scali, 77, American journalist and diplomat.

10
Fateh Chand Badhwar, 94-95, Indian civil servant.
Doug Cline, 57, American football player.
Robert Finch, 70, American politician, heart attack.
Ed Gill, 100, American baseball player.
Paolo Gucci, 64, Italian businessman and fashion designer.
Carl Barton Huffaker, 81, American biologist, ecologist and agricultural entomologist.
Lars Näsman, 52, Finnish football player and coach.
Doug Russell, 84, American gridiron football player.

11
Isolde Ahlgrimm, 81, Austrian harpsichordist and fortepianist.
Donald Beckford, 88, Jamaican cricketer.
Huang Yijun, 80, Chinese conductor and composer.
Jeff York, 83, American actor (Old Yeller, The Postman Always Rings Twice, The Alaskans).

12
Eleanor Aller, 78, American cellist.
Harald Barlie, 58, Norwegian Greco-Roman wrestler and Olympic athlete.
George Blaikie, 80, Australian author and journalist.
Gary Bond, 55, English actor (Joseph and the Amazing Technicolor Dreamcoat, Anne of the Thousand Days, Wake in Fright) and singer, AIDS-related complications.
David McLean, 73, American actor, lung cancer.
Hans Wärmling, 52, Swedish musician and songwriter, drowned.

13
John Tyler Caldwell, 83, American academic and professor of political science.
Geoffrey Chung, 44, Jamaican musician, recording engineer, and record producer, liver failure.
Michael Lah, 83, Slovenian-American animator.
Henry Roth, 89, American novelist and short story writer.
Béla Varga, 92, Hungarian Catholic priest and politician.
Jean Weber, 89, French film actor.
Herbert Weißbach, 93, German actor, cabaret artist, and voice actor.

14
John R. P. French, 82, American psychologist.
William Fritz, 81, Canadian sprinter and Olympian.
Gunvor Hofmo, 74, Norwegian writer.
Edith Pargeter, 82, English author.
Helen Vlachos, 83, Greek journalist and anti-junta activist.
Karl Widmark, 84, Swedish sprint canoeists.

15
Akhat Bragin, 42, Ukrainian businessman, bomb attack.
Marco Campos, 19, Brazilian racing driver, racing accident.
Claudine Chomat, 80, French communist militant and member of the resistance during World War II.
Thelma Griffith Haynes, 82, Canadian-American Major League Baseball executive.
Bengt Åkerblom, 28, Swedish ice hockey player.

16
Richard Caldicot, 87, British actor.
Günther Happich, 43, Austrian football midfielder.
Jimmie Lewallen, 76, American stock car racing driver, cancer.
Augustine Martin, 59, Irish academic, writer, broadcaster and literary critic.
Joe Pearce, 85, Australian rugby player and coach.
Thoogudeepa Srinivas, 52, Indian film actor.
John Walker, 88, American art curator.

17
Mike Brittain, 32, American basketball player.
Peter Hinchliff, 66, South African Anglican priest and academic.
Fachtna O'Donovan, 74, Irish sportsperson.
Pál Zolnay, 67, Hungarian film director, screenwriter and actor.

18
Claudio Brook, 68, Mexican actor, stomach cancer.
Franco Fabrizi, 79, Italian actor, cancer.
Ada Lois Sipuel Fisher, 71, American lawyer and civil rights activist.
Edward Griffiths, 66, British politician.
Bryan Johnson, 69, English singer and actor.
Tommy Lyttle, 56, Irish Ulster loyalist and paramilitary, heart attack.
William Mackey, 80, Canadian Catholic priest and Jesuit educator, sepsis.
Ted Sturgis, 82, American jazz bassist.
Ted Whiteaway, 66, British racing driver.

19
Don Cherry, 58, American jazz trumpeter, liver cancer.
Kumari Naaz, 51, Indian film actress.
Harilaos Perpessas, 88, Greek composer.
Jaroslav Rudnyckyj, 84, Ukrainian-Canadian linguist, lexicographer, author and publicist.
Don Williams, 59, Australian rules football player.

20
Eric Birley, 89, British historian and archaeologist.
William D. Campbell, 88, American leader of the international Scouting movement.
Riccardo Carapellese, 73, Italian football manager and player.
Jack Rose, 83, American screenwriter.
Christopher Stone, 53, American actor, heart attack.
John Tonkin, 93, Australian politician.

21
Maxene Andrews, 79, American singer and actress and member of The Andrews Sisters.
Jesús Blasco, 75, Spanish comic book author.
José Ignacio Cabrujas, 58, Venezuelan playwright and theater director, heart attack.
Harold I. Cammer, 86, American lawyer who co-founded the National Lawyers Guild.
Manuel Vázquez Gallego, 65, Spanish cartoonist.
Linda Goodman, 70, American astrologer and poet, diabetes.
Nancy Graves, 55, American sculptor, painter, and printmaker, ovarian cancer.
Sverre Hansen, 76, Norwegian actor.
Hans Helfritz, 93, German composer and photographer.
Shannon Hoon, 28, American singer-songwriter, drug overdose.
Vada Pinson, 57, American baseball player and coach, stroke.
Abel Salazar, 78, Mexican actor, producer and director, Alzheimer's disease.
Anatoly Shelyukhin, 65, Soviet cross-country skier and Olympian.

22
Kingsley Amis, 73, English author (Lucky Jim, Jake's Thing, The Old Devils).
Mario Costa, 91, Italian actor, director and screenwriter.
Simone Gallimard, 77, French editor and publisher, cancer.
Ralph Whitlock, 81, British farmer, conservationist, writer, and broadcaster.
Mary Wickes, 85, American actress (White Christmas, Sister Act, The Hunchback of Notre Dame), complications following surgery.

23
Bert Bandstra, 73, American politician.
Johnny Bookman, 63, American gridiron football player.
Helen Gilbert, 80, American film actress and musician.
Don Pendleton, 67, American author of fiction and non-fiction books.

24
Marion Adnams, 96, English painter, printmaker and draughtswoman.
Jan Bartosik, 47, Polish sailor and Olympian.
Syed Abuzar Bukhari, Pakistani scholar and president of Majlis-e-Ahrar-ul-Islam.
Émile Jonassaint, 82, Haitian jurist and politician (1994),.
Hermann Langbein, 83, Austrian communist resistance fighter and historian.
Andrés Aguilar Mawdsley, 71, Venezuelan lawyer and diplomat (b. 1924)
Anna Wood, 15, Australian teenager, drug overdose.
Ronnie Selby Wright, 87, Scottish Church of Scotland minister.

25
Agha Saadat Ali, 66, Pakistani cricketer.
François Brousse, 82, French philosophy professor and poet.
Noel Crump, 78, New Zealand freestyle swimmer.
Kenneth Dadzie, 65, Ghanaian diplomat and 1st African Secretary-General of UNCTAD.
Gavin Ewart, 79, British poet.
Robert Grieve, 84, Scottish civil servant and planner.
David Healy, 66, American-born actor.
Bernhard Heiliger, 79, German artist.
Jan Hoffman, 89, Polish pianist and music educator.
Viveca Lindfors, 74, Swedish actress, arthritis.
Bobby Riggs, 77, American tennis player, prostate cancer.
B. F. Sisk, 84, American politician.
Miljenko Smoje, 72, Croatian writer and journalist, lung cancer.
Peter Stallard, 80, British colonial governor.

26
Kumbha Ram Arya, 81, Indian politician.
Georgia Neese Clark Gray, 97, first woman Treasurer of the United States.
Hamilton E. Holmes, 54, American orthopedic physician, heart failure.
Wilhelm Freddie, 86, Danish painter.
Fylymon Kurchaba, 81, Ukrainian Greek Catholic hierarch, auxiliary bishop of Lviv (since 1985).
John Sangster, 66, Australian jazz composer, arranger and multi-instrumentalist.

27
André Berge, 93, French physician and psychoanalyst.
Marta Colvin, 87-88, Chileán sculptor.
Jacques Heurgon, 92, French historian and classical philologist.
Mumtaz Mufti, 90, Pakistani writer.
Richard Ryder, 53, American actor, AIDS-related complications.
Slobodan Selenić, 62, Serbian writer, literary critic, and academic, cancer.

28
Fouad Abdulhameed Alkhateeb, 69-70, Saudi Arabian ambassador, author, and businessman.
Chingiz Babayev, 31, Azerbaijani officer and National Hero of Azerbaijan, killed in action.
Thomas Bellew, 52, Irish politician.
Julien Bertheau, 85, French actor.
Edward Drabiński, 83, Polish football player and manager.
Morris Williams, 71, Australian politician.

29
Robert Boeser, 68, American ice hockey player.
Fred Gerbic, 63, New Zealand politician.
Jean Heather, 74, American actress.
Minna Lederman, 99, American editor and writer on music and dance.
Al Niemiec, 84, American baseball second basemen and shortstop.
Terry Southern, 71, American screenwriter (Dr. Strangelove, Easy Rider, Saturday Night Live) and author.

30
Louis Abolafia, 54, American artist and social activist, drug overdose.
Paolo Alatri, 77, Italian historian and Marxist politician.
Anastasios Balkos, 79, Greek Army lieutenant general and conservative politician.
Stephen Bekassy, 88, Hungarian-born American film actor.
Virginia Bradford, 95, American actress.
Brian Easdale, 86, British composer of orchestral, choral and film music.
Paul Ferris, 54, English film composer and actor, suicide.
David M. Schneider, 76, American cultural anthropologist.

31
Royal B. Allison, 76, United States Air Force lieutenant general, cancer.
Word Baker, 72, American theatre director.
Caroline Bammel, 55, English historian, classicist, and academic, cancer.
Glenn Berry, 90, American gymnast who competed in the 1928 Summer Olympics.
Alan Bush, 94, British composer, pianist, and conductor.
Jim Campbell, 71, American baseball executive (Detroit Tigers).
Rosalind Cash, 56, American actress (The Omega Man, General Hospital, Klute), cancer.
Derek Enright, 60, British Labour politician.
Dr. Hepcat, 82, American blues pianist, singer, and baseball commentator.
Lou Levy, 84, American music publisher.
Joel Mason, 83, American NFL football player and NBL basketball player.
Mario Napolitano, 85, Italian chess master.
Henry Percy, 11th Duke of Northumberland, 42, British peer, neurological disorder.
Bill Rowling, 67, 30th Prime Minister of New Zealand, cancer.

References 

1995-10
10